Aristolochia clematitis, the (European) birthwort, is a twining herbaceous plant in the family Aristolochiaceae, which is native to Europe. The leaves are heart shaped and the flowers are pale yellow and tubular in form. The plant seeks light by ascending the stems of surrounding plants.

Toxicity
It was formerly used as a medicinal plant, though it is poisonous, and is now occasionally found established outside of its native range as a relic of cultivation. It is now thought to be the cause of thousands of kidney failures in Romania, Bulgaria, Serbia, Bosnia and Herzegovina  and Croatia. The initial hypothesis that seeds from the plant were unintentionally consumed through contaminated flour has come to be questioned. Urinary tract malignancies among those who have consumed the plant are also reported. The link between kidney failure and aristolochic acid, which the plant contains, was discovered after a clinic for obesity in Belgium used herbal products based on another plant of the same genus as a diuretic. After a few months, some of the patients experienced kidney failure.

See also
 Balkan nephropathy

References 

clematitis
Medicinal plants of Europe
Plants described in 1753
Taxa named by Carl Linnaeus